Audiovisual art is the exploration of kinetic abstract art and music or sound set in relation to each other. It includes 
visual music, abstract film, audiovisual performances and installations.

Overview
The book Art and the Senses cites the Italian Futurist artists, Fortunato Depero and Luigi Russolo as designing art machines in 1915 to create a multisensory experience of sound, movement and colour. In the 1970s Harry Bertoia created sound sculptures of objects to have a multisensory effect, exploring the relationships between the sound, the initiating event and the material properties of the objects. In an example with overt musical connections, The Oxford Handbook of New Audiovisual Aesthetics cites musician Brian Williams (aka Lustmord) as someone whose practise crosses audiovisual art and mainstream media, where his work is "not traditionally 'musical'" and has "clearly visual aspects".

See also 

 Abstract film
 Audiovisualogy
 Color organ
 Experimental film
 Sound art
 Sound installation
 Sound sculpture
 Synaesthesia
 Video art
 Visual music

References

Further reading 
 
 Adriano Abbado, "Perceptual Correspondences of Abstract Animation and Synthetic Sound", Leonardo, Volume 21, Issue 5, MIT Press, 1988 
 Andy Hunt, Ross Kirk, Richard Orton, Benji Merrison, "A generic model for compositional approaches to audiovisual media", Cambridge Journals, 1998 
 Rodrigo F. Cádiz, "Fuzzy logic in the arts: applications in audiovisual composition and sound synthesis", NAFIPS, 2005 
 Michael Faulkner/D-FUSE, "vj audio-visual art + vj culture", Laurence King Publishing Ltd, 2006
 Mick Grierson, "Audiovisual composition", into the pill, 2007 
 Holly Rogers, Sounding the Gallery: Video and the Rise of Art Music (New York: Oxford University Press, 2013).

 

 
Music and video